Dryopteris hirtipes is fern species native to South China and Papua New Guinea.

References

GBIF entry

hirtipes